The 2019 Honda Indy Toronto was an IndyCar Series motor race held on 14 July 2019 at the Exhibition Place in Toronto, Ontario, Canada. It was the 11th race of the 2019 IndyCar Series season, and the 38th race at the event. It was won by Team Penske driver Simon Pagenaud who started from pole and led eighty of the eighty-five laps. Scott Dixon finished in second for Chip Ganassi Racing while Alexander Rossi came third for Andretti Autosport.

Background
The Honda Indy Toronto was confirmed as part of the IndyCar's 2019 series schedule on September 2018. It was the third of a four year deal that Honda Canada had contracted with the contract ending in 2020. Heading into the Toronto round, Team Penske driver Josef Newgarden lead the driver's championship with 402 points. His nearest rival and the last's round winner, Alexander Rossi from Andretti Autosport was seven points behind. Third was Simon Pagenaud from Team Penske a further 54 points behind with Scott Dixon and Will Power rounding out the top five.

The race was preceded by Canadian driver Robert Wickens, who was still recovering from a heavy accident in Pocono the previous year, driving a lap around the circuit in a modified Arrow Acura NSX with hand controls. Wickens also gave the starting command.

Results

Qualifying

Race

Notes:
 Points include 1 point for leading at least 1 lap during a race, an additional 2 points for leading the most race laps, and 1 point for Pole Position.

Championship standings after the race 

Drivers' Championship standings

Manufacturer standings

 Note: Only the top five positions are included.

References 

Honda Indy Toronto
Honda Indy Toronto
Honda Indy Toronto
2019
Honda Indy Toronto